Jean Annette Paton  (née Comins or Comyn; born 4 January 1929) is a British botanist, bryologist and botanical illustrator. She has written many books on the bryology of the United Kingdom and the flora of Cornwall, and described several new species. 

Paton has been called the "queen of vice-county recording" for her prolific records of bryological specimens in the second half of the 20th century. She was president of the British Bryological Society in 1976 and 1977.

Early life
Paton was born on 4 January 1929. She is dyslexic and could not read until she was nine. Paton taught herself to draw and paint flowers when she was young, which later helped her to learn their names.

She attended Bedford College in London from 1947, and later completed an MSc, doing a dissertation on the bryophytes of the sandstone rocks of Kent and Sussex.

Career
Paton began work at the University of Southampton's Botany Department in 1952 as a research and herbarium assistant, and later became a lecturer there. In 1959, she moved to Cornwall with her husband Pat. There, she wrote Wild Flowers in Cornwall and the Isles of Scilly and Flowers of the Cornish Coast published in 1968 and 1969 respectively.

Paton was president of the British Bryological Society in 1976 and 1977 and was elected an honorary member in 1987.

Her The Liverwort Flora of the British Isles was published in 1999 and was described as the "best liverwort flora ever published in Europe". Eric Vernon Watson called it a "landmark in the study of British liverworts". Paton won the Linnean Society's Jill Smythies Award in May 2000 for her illustrations in the book, and the International Association of Bryologists Sinske Hattori Prize for the best publication of 1999/2000. Paton published a supplement to The Liverwort Flora in 2022.

In 2001, she and Pat published Magnolias in Cornish Gardens and in 2005, she published Bryophyte Flora of the Isles of Scilly with David Holyoak.

Paton was awarded an MBE in the 2003 New Year Honours for services to biology and nature conservation.

Throughout her career, Paton described a number of species new to science, including Anthoceros agrestis, Ditrichum cornubicum, Lophocolea brookwoodiana, Telaranea murphyae and Fissidens celticus. In addition to this, she added many species to the list of bryophytes known in Britain, including Southbya tophacea, Lophocolea semeteres, and Marsupella profunda.

Between 1947 and 1999, Paton was the top recorder of specimens in Britain, recording 1,924 of the 22,532 specimens in the period. Her herbariums have been added to the collections of the Royal Botanic Garden, Edinburgh, and to the Natural History Museum, London.

Personal life
Paton married Valentine 'Pat' Paton in October 1952.

References

1929 births
Living people
Bryologists
Women bryologists
Botanical illustrators
Members of the Order of the British Empire
Alumni of Bedford College, London
20th-century British botanists
21st-century British botanists
British women botanists
British women illustrators
20th-century British women scientists
21st-century British women scientists
Scientists with dyslexia